Charles Corm (1894–1963) was a Lebanese writer, industrialist and philanthropist. He is considered to be the leader of the Phoenicianism movement in Lebanon which ignited a surge of nationalism that led to Lebanon's independence. In a country torn by sectarian conflicts, Corm's intention was to find a common root shared by all Lebanese beyond their religious beliefs. At the age of 40, he quit a successful business empire to dedicate his time to poetry and writing.

Over the course of his life, Corm received more than a hundred international literary and non-literary honors and awards, including the Edgar Allan Poe International Poetry Prize 1934, Citizen of Honor of New York City (USA), Grand Commander of the American International Academy (USA), Commander of the Order of Human Merit (Switzerland), Grand Officer of the Italian Academic Order (Italy), Grand Officer of the National Order of the Cedar (Lebanon), Grand Officer of the French Poets' Society (France), Fellow of the Royal Society (England) and the Medal of Honor of the Académie Française 1950 (France).

Writer
Although most Lebanese authors at the time wrote in Arabic, Corm mostly wrote in French. One of his main intellectual contributions is La Revue Phénicienne, a publication he founded in July 1919 in which many writers such as Michel Chiha and Said Akl took part and which inspired Lebanon's independence. Rushdy Maalouf, the father of Académie Française member and Francophone novelist Amin Maalouf, wrote: "Charles was the first one to show us how to love Lebanon, how to chant and rhapsodize Lebanon, how to vaunt and defend Lebanon, and how to become master-builders of this Lebanon."

Corm is considered one of the most influential and awarded Middle Eastern writers. His La Montagne Inspirée ("The Sacred Mountain" in English), earned him the Edgar Allan Poe International Prize of Poetry in 1934. Additionally, Corm, whose father Daoud Corm was a teacher and mentor to the young Khalil Gibran, was the French translator of Gibran's English masterpiece The Prophet.

Industrialist
Upon graduation at the age of 18, Corm travelled to New York City where he rented a small office on Wall Street to conduct an import/export business. Soon after, Charles Corm obtained a meeting with business tycoon Henry Ford, the richest man in the world at the time. Subsequent to the meeting, Corm secured the Ford Motor Company dealership for the entire Greater Middle East region at a time when Ford Motor Company was the only car maker in the world. At its height, Corm's business empire, all folded into "Charles Corm and Co.", was the first and largest multinational in the Middle East, employing thousands of men and women from Turkey to Iran. His enterprises became the livelihood of thousands of families and contributed to developing the infrastructure and networks of roads, railways and bridges in countries that had not yet even come into being.

In 1928 he designed Ford Motor Company's Middle East Headquarters, later to be named "The Corm Building and Gardens", with no formal architectural training. The building was erected in 1929 in Beirut, later becoming the Corm family home. It was the Middle East's first skyscraper and highest standing structure in Lebanon until 1967. Reflecting Charles Corm's ecologist instincts, long before that term had come to carry its modern social and ideological "activist" connotations, the building's 14,000 m2 gardens (the largest private gardens in Beirut) contain a variety of artistic and archaeological relics as well as exotic trees and rare plants.

His wealth made, the man who had been referred to as "the reluctant tycoon" decided to devote his life to literature and philanthropy on the occasion of his 40th birthday.

Philanthropist
Corm helped finance several Lebanese state buildings and entities including the Lebanese Parliament, the National Museum, the National Library and other state and cultural landmarks at a time when the nascent Lebanese state lacked funds, freshly independent from its French mandate status. He also personally financed the Lebanese pavilion at the 1939 World Fair in New York City, for which Mayor LaGuardia made him Citizen of Honor of New York City, the highest distinction given out by the city.

Corm's close friend Said Akl noted: "Charles not only was a guiding force behind Lebanon’s independence, he also helped lay Lebanon’s constitutional foundations and spent his own money building the political, social and cultural landmarks needed to support our vision of Lebanon. During those years, it seemed very clear to me that Charles did not care much about money. Rather, a deep sense of commitment to what he loved had rewarded him with outstanding success in both business and literature."

Personal life
Charles Corm was born in 1894 in Beirut, Lebanon, the son of the famous Lebanese painter Daoud Corm (sometimes Anglicised as "David Corm"). He graduated from the Oriental Faculty at Saint Joseph University with high honors. At the age of 18, in 1912, he travelled to New York. To survive, he set up an import/export business on Broadway. As his first language was French, he resolutely attended the same Broadway show again and again until he had learned the basics of New York English. In 1934, at age 40, he left business for a life of literature and philanthropy. Due to his exceptional success in business and later on acclaimed literary endeavors, Corm enjoyed an impressive international contact network. According to Rushdy Maalouf, "Charles had the amazing faculty to befriend all kind of people with the same ease. At times, it seemed there was nobody he did not know. This granted him tremendous clout in business, literature and politics. Whether through business or art, Charles spent his life building powerful bridges between Lebanon, often referred to at the time as the Paris of the Middle East, and the West".

Back in Beirut's golden years, Rushdy Maalouf also noted that it was not unusual for artists, intellectuals and business, political and cultural figures visiting Lebanon for the first time to have Charles Corm and his home, which hosted grandiose parties, on their itinerary of people and places to see: "they visited Lebanon seeking Charles Corm the same way some of us may visit Athens to see the Acropolis. This is the veneration that many, Lebanese and foreigners alike, held for Charles Corm and is so present in his mystique".

An uncommitted bachelor for most of his life, Charles Corm finally married Samia Baroody in 1935. Samia Baroody had been Miss Lebanon and took second place in the 1934 Miss Universe pageant in New York City. Charles Corm and his wife Samia went on to have four children: David, Hiram, Virginie and Madeleine.

In addition to his prolific literary legacy that can now be found in most libraries and universities around the world, Charles Corm left one of the most substantial fortunes in the region.

Works
La Revue Phénicienne
La Montagne Inspirée, Edgar Allan Poe International Poetry Prize 1934 (translated into English under the title "The Sacred Mountain")
6000 ans de Génie Pacifique au Service de l'Humanité (translated into English under the title "6000 Years of Peaceful Contributions to Mankind")
Contes Erotiques (translated into English under the title "Erotic Tales")
Les Cahiers de l'Enfant
Sonnets Adolescents
La Montagne Parfumée
L'Eternel Féminin
Médaillons en Musique de l'Ame Libanaise
Petite Cosmogonie Sentimentale
La Planète Exaltée
Le Mystère de l'Amour
La Symphonie de la Lumière
La Terre Assassinée ou Les Ciliciennes 
Le Volcan Embrasé

Honors and awards

Edgar Allan Poe International Prize of Poetry 1934.
Citizen of Honor of New York City, USA.
Medal of Honor of the Académie Française 1950, France.
Fellow of the Royal Society, England.
Grand Commander of the American International Academy, USA.
Grand Commander of the Order of Saint Gregory, Vatican City.
Grand Commander of the Sovereign Order of the Crown of Thorns, Italy. 
Commander of the Order of Human Merit, Switzerland.
Commander of the Humanitarian Society of Belgium.
Commander of the Saint Stephen Society of Human Rights, USA.
Commander of the Casa Humberto de Campos, Brazil.
Commander of the Academia dei Templari, Italy.
Grand Officer of the National Order of the Cedar, Lebanon.
Grand Officer of the French Poets' Society.
Grand Officer of the Académie Ronsard, France.
Grand Officer of the Jerusalem Temple Order, Italy.
Grand Officer of the Order of Saint Brigite, Sweden.
Grand Officer of the Italian Academic Order, Italy.
Grand Officer of the Order of Vera Cruz, Brazil.
Grand Officer of the Instituto Panamericana de Culture, Argentina.
Grand Officer of the Grupo Americanista de Intelectuales y Artistas, Uruguay.
Grand Officer of the Academia National de Ciencias y Letras, Bolivia.
Grand Officer of the Comision Interamericana de la Bandera, Cuba.
Grand Officer of the Academia de Bella Aries, Spain.
Grand Officer of the Sociedade Brasileira de Civismo, Brazil.
Grand Officer of the Casa Americana, Peru.
Gold Medal of New York City for Distinguished Services, USA.
Gold Medal of Newark City, New Jersey, USA.
Gold Medal of the Latin Order, France.
Gold Medal of the Saint Andrew Imperial Order, Russia.
Gold Medal of the Instituto Napoletano di Cultura, Italy.
Gold Medal of the Order of San Bernardo, Brazil.
Gold Medal of the Academia de Ballas Artes de San Carlos, Spain.
Gold Medal of the National College of Ontario, Canada.

References

External links

Lebanese nationalists
20th-century Lebanese poets
Lebanese novelists
Ford Motor Company
Saint Joseph University alumni
Phoenicianists
1894 births
1963 deaths
Lebanese male poets
Lebanese magazine founders